Bob Bryan and Mike Bryan were the defending champions, but chose not to participate that year.

Ernests Gulbis and Rainer Schüttler won in the final 7–5, 7–6(7–3), against Pablo Cuevas and Marcel Granollers-Pujol.

Seeds

Draw

Draw

External links
Association of Tennis Professionals (ATP) draw

Doubles